Rafael Tobias de Aguiar (October 4, 1794 — October 7, 1857) was a Brazilian politician and military officer, from Sorocaba, São Paulo. He was one of the São Paulo Liberal Revolution leaders in 1842.

References

1795 births
1857 deaths
Brazilian politicians
People from Sorocaba